San Antonio de Flores is a municipality in the Honduran department of El Paraíso.

It's a municipality located between mountains and it is close to the border with Nicaragua.

References 

Municipalities of the El Paraíso Department